Salseng C Marak is a senior leader of Indian National Congress in the northeastern state of Meghalaya. He attended Kolkata's Scottish Church College.

He is a former Chief Minister of the state.

References

Living people
Scottish Church College alumni
University of Calcutta alumni
Chief Ministers of Meghalaya
Chief ministers from Indian National Congress
Meghalaya MLAs 1993–1998
State cabinet ministers of Meghalaya
Meghalaya politicians
1941 births
Garo people